Belo Garden Park is a  public park located in downtown Dallas, Texas, United States. The park is located between Main and Commerce, east of Griffin in the Main Street District. The park, formerly a parking lot, features perennial gardens, shaded groves, plaza spaces, an interactive fountain, a 10’ high hill which provides topographical relief and views over the central fountain plaza, and a shaded garden grove with movable tables and chairs.
In 2006 Belo Corporation (the owners of Dallas-area ABC affiliate WFAA and The Dallas Morning News) committed $6.5 million toward the $14.5 million construction of the park. It is one of several downtown parks planned by the City of Dallas, which include Main Street Garden Park and Pacific Plaza Park.

Although scheduled for groundbreaking in 2008 the timeline was delayed due to the discovery of contaminated soil. Soil removal began in July 2010, and the park was re-scheduled to open in early 2012.

Belo Garden's design has been the center of local controversy. A 12-foot wall separating the park from the adjacent Metropolitan Building was included for reasons including traffic protection and noise isolation. Professionals called this feature unneeded and anti-urban, but a resolution with Belo was not reached.

Shooting

On July 7, 2016, Belo Garden became the scene of a mass shooting targeting police officers. Five officers were killed and eight others injured by sniper fire. It is the deadliest attack on U.S. law enforcement since the September 11 attacks.

References

External links 
 
Dallas Parks Master Plan
Hargreaves Associates
Belo Press Release

Buildings and structures in Dallas
Parks in Dallas